Reghini is an Italian surname. Notable people with the surname include:

Arturo Reghini (1878–1946), Italian mathematician, philosopher, and esotericist
Caesar Reghini (1581–1658), Italian Roman Catholic prelate

Italian-language surnames